Germán Villa Castañeda  (born 2 April 1973) is a Mexican former professional footballer who played as a midfielder.

German made his debut in the 1991–92 season with América against Leon. Villa played regularly with América until 1998 when he decided to go to the Spanish league to play for Espanyol de Barcelona. Villa returned to Mexico for the Verano 1999 season to play with América. He then transferred to Necaxa where he played one tournament. Villa returned to América for the Verano 2000 season. Villa has won two championships, the first in Verano 2002 season and the second in Clausura 2005. He was a vital part of the Mexico national team that played in the 1998 FIFA World Cup and also the 2002 FIFA World Cup tournament.

In November 2009, German Villa signed a contract with Querétaro to play at least one year.

German Villa is regarded as one of América's finest cantera players of all time, and ranks among the top tier of Mexico's footballers. He is considered one of the best defensive midfielders Mexico has had in the past decade.

Honours
América
Mexican Primera División: Verano 2002, Clausura 2005
Campeón de Campeones: 2005
CONCACAF Champions' Cup: 1992, 2006
CONCACAF Giants Cup: 2001

Mexico
FIFA Confederations Cup: 1999
CONCACAF Gold Cup: 1996, 1998

External links
 
 
 
 
 Germán Villa at FootballDatabase.com
 youtube.com

1973 births
Living people
Club América footballers
Club Necaxa footballers
Querétaro F.C. footballers
La Liga players
RCD Espanyol footballers
1997 Copa América players
1997 FIFA Confederations Cup players
1998 FIFA World Cup players
1999 FIFA Confederations Cup players
2002 FIFA World Cup players
CONCACAF Gold Cup-winning players
FIFA Confederations Cup-winning players
Footballers from Mexico City
Footballers at the 1996 Summer Olympics
Olympic footballers of Mexico
Mexico international footballers
Association football midfielders
Expatriate footballers in Spain
Mexican expatriates in Spain
Mexican footballers
Mexican people of Spanish descent
1996 CONCACAF Gold Cup players
1998 CONCACAF Gold Cup players
Pan American Games medalists in football
Pan American Games silver medalists for Mexico
Medalists at the 1995 Pan American Games
Footballers at the 1995 Pan American Games